Gordon Ingate OAM (born 29 March 1926) is an Australian sailor who competed in the 1972 Summer Olympics, sailing in the Tempest class keelboat. He also finished a close second overall in the 1972 Sydney to Hobart Yacht Race, skippering the famous yacht Caprice of Huon, beaten only by USA America's Cup sailor Ted Turner sailing a converted 12-metre, American Eagle.

He skippered 12-Metre Gretel II in the 1977 America's Cup but was eliminated by Sweden in the challengers' trials.

At the age of 91 he won the Prince Philip Cup/Australian Dragon Class Championship at the Metung Yacht Club in Victoria, held between 7–13 January 2018, racing his yacht Whimsical with crew Amy Walsh and David Giles. In 2020, he received a Lifetime Achievement Award from Australian Sailing.

He is a longstanding member of the Royal Sydney Yacht Squadron and the New York Yacht Club.

References

1926 births
Living people
Australian male sailors (sport)
Olympic sailors of Australia
Sailors at the 1972 Summer Olympics – Tempest
20th-century Australian people